Jones Awuah (born 7 October 1983) is a Ghanaian association football player.

Career

Professional
He began his career with Gillingham and made his professional debut in the Football League First Division against Nottingham Forest on 18 September 2002.  Whilst at Gillingham he had loan periods at Sittingbourne in October 2002, Dover Athletic in February 2004, Worthing and Woking. He was released in the summer of 2005 by Gillingham.

Semi-professional
He then dropped into non-league football, playing for Aveley and Bromley in 2005, Sutton United where he moved in February 2006, and Beckenham Town in late 2006.

He joined Dorchester Town on a short-term deal in August 2007, making his first team debut on 14 August against Havant & Waterlooville. He moved to Fisher Athletic in February 2008 and Bognor Regis Town in December 2008.  A move to Winchester City followed in March 2009, and then quickly onto Weymouth.

He then joined Carshalton Athletic for a time before being released, next joining Middlesex side Ashford Town in February 2010.  At the start of the 2011–12 season he joined Burgess Hill Town and was released by the club at the end of January 2012.

References

1983 births
Living people
Ghanaian footballers
Gillingham F.C. players
Worthing F.C. players
Dover Athletic F.C. players
Woking F.C. players
Sutton United F.C. players
Maidenhead United F.C. players
Bromley F.C. players
Dorchester Town F.C. players
Fisher Athletic F.C. players
Weymouth F.C. players
Beckenham Town F.C. players
Ashford Town (Middlesex) F.C. players
Burgess Hill Town F.C. players
Carshalton Athletic F.C. players
Winchester City F.C. players
Bognor Regis Town F.C. players
Aveley F.C. players
Sittingbourne F.C. players
Association football forwards